Nokia 3710 is a feature phone manufactured by Nokia. It was announced by Nokia in June 2009 and released in December of that year. It was hailed as the direct successor to the Nokia 3610 fold, the previous model launched at the end of 2008.

Measurements 
It measured 89 x 47 x 15.2 mm, 54 cc (3.50 x 1.85 x 0.60 in), 2.2 inches  (~35.8% screen-to-body ratio) and weighed 94 grams. It had a resolution of 240 x 320 pixels (with ~182 ppi pixel density).

Technical specifications 
The phone had a memory of 2000 entries, and an internal memory of 70 MB.  The primary camera featured 3.2 MP, LED flash and enhanced fixed focus.  The secondary one was a  VGA videocall camera.  It had three different alert types: downloadable polyphonic, MP3 ringtones and vibration.  It also featured a loudspeaker and 2.5 mm audio jack, A-GPS, Stereo FM radio (RDS), and a microUSB v.2.0.  It also benefits from  UMTS technology.

Other features 
The Nokia 3710 also had these features: SMS, MMS, Email, IM messaging capacity; WAP 2.0/xHTML, HTML, Adobe Flash Lite browsers, MIDP 2.1 - MP3/eAAC+/WAV/WMA player, MP4/WMV/H.264 player, Organizer, Voice command/dial/memo, Predictive text input and JAVA.  It had a numeric keypad and soft keys. Available in black, pink and plum colors it had a music play length of up to 24 hours.

References

3710 fold
Mobile phones introduced in 2009